Elbląg (Old Prussian: Elbings) is a city in the Warmian-Masurian Voivodeship, Poland, located in the eastern edge of the Żuławy region with 117,390 inhabitants, as of December 2021. It is the capital of Elbląg County.

Elbląg is one of the oldest cities in the province. Its history dates back to 1237, when the Teutonic Order constructed their fortified stronghold on the banks of a nearby river. The castle subsequently served as the official seat of the Teutonic Order Masters.

Elbląg became part of the Hanseatic League, which contributed much to the city's wealth. Through the Hansa agreement, the city was linked to other major ports like Gdańsk, Lübeck and Amsterdam. Elbląg joined Poland in 1454 and after the defeat of the Teutonic Knights in the Thirteen Years’ War was recognized as part of Poland in the Second Peace of Thorn in 1466. It then flourished and turned into a significant trading point, but its growth was eventually hindered by the Second Northern War and the Swedish Deluge.

The city was transferred to Prussia after the first partition of Poland in 1772. Its trading role greatly weakened, until the era of industrialization, which occurred in the 19th century. It was then that the famous Elbląg Canal was commissioned.

After World War II the city again became part of Poland. The war casualties were catastrophic, especially the severe destruction of the Old Town district, one of the grandest in Prussia. 

Today, Elbląg has over 120,000 inhabitants and is a "vibrant city with an attractive tourist base". It serves as an academic and financial center and among its numerous historic monuments is the Market Gate from 1309 and St. Nicholas Cathedral. Elbląg is also known for its archaeological sites, museums and the largest brewery in the country.

The Elbląg Canal, built in 1825–44, is a tourist site of Elbląg. The canal is believed to be one of the most important monuments related to the history of engineering, and has been named one of the Seven Wonders of Poland. The canal was also named one of Poland's official national Historic Monuments (Pomnik historii) in 2011. Its listing is maintained by the National Heritage Board of Poland.

Etymology
Elbląg derives from the earlier German-language Elbing, which is the name by which the Teutonic Knights knew both the river here and the citadel they established on its banks in 1237. The purpose of the citadel was to prevent the Old Prussian settlement of Truso from being reoccupied, the German crusaders being at war with the pagan Prussians. The citadel was named after the river, itself of uncertain etymology. One traditional etymology connects it to the name of the Helveconae, a Germanic tribe mentioned in Ancient Greek and Latin sources, but the etymology or language of the tribal name remains unknown. The oldest known mention of the river or town Elbląg is in the form Ylfing in the report of a sailor Wulfstan from the end of the 9th century, in The Voyages of Ohthere and Wulfstan which was written in Anglo-Saxon in King Alfred's reign.

Modern city 

The city was almost completely destroyed at the end of World War II. Parts of the inner city were gradually rebuilt, and around 2000 rebuilding was begun in a style emulating the previous architecture, in many cases over the same foundations and utilizing old bricks and portions of the same walls. The western suburbs of the old city have not been reconstructed.

The modern city adjoins about half the length of the river between Lake Drużno and Elbląg Bay (Zatoka Elbląska, an arm of the Vistula Lagoon), and spreads out on both banks, though mainly on the eastern side.

Views to the west show flat fields extending to the horizon; this part of the Vistula Delta (Żuławy Wiślane) is used mainly for agricultural purposes. To the south are the marshes and swamps of Drużno. The Elbląg River has been left in a more natural state through the city, but elsewhere it is a controlled channel with branches. One of them, the Jagiellonski Channel (Kanał Jagielloński), leads to the Nogat River, along which navigation to Gdańsk is common. The Elbląg Canal (Kanał Elbląski) connecting Lake Drużno with Drwęca River and Lake Jeziorak is a tourist site.

Elbląg is not a deep-water port. The turning area at Elbląg is  diameter and a pilot is required for large vessels. Deep water vessels cannot manoeuvre; in that sense, Elbląg has become a subsidiary port of Gdańsk. Traffic of smaller vessels at Elbląg is within the river and very marginal, while larger vessels cannot reach the open Baltic Sea because the channel has belonged to Russia since 1945. As of September 17, the construction of Vistula Spit canal on Polish territory has been completed. The city features three quay complexes, movable cranes, and railways.

Geography

Geographical location 

Climate
The climate of Elbląg is an oceanic climate (Köppen Cfb) closely bordering on a humid continental climate (Köppen Dfb), owing to its position of the Baltic Sea, which moderates the temperatures, compared to the interior of Poland. The climate is cool throughout the year and there is a somewhat uniform precipitation throughout the year. Typical of Northern Europe, there is little sunshine during the year.

History

Truso

The settlement was first mentioned as "Ilfing" in The Voyages of Ohthere and Wulfstan, an Anglo-Saxon chronicle written in King Alfred's reign using information from a Viking who had visited the area.

During the Middle Ages, the Viking settlement of Truso was located on Lake Drużno, near the current site of Elbląg in historical Pogesania; the settlement burned down in the 10th century. Early in the 13th century the Teutonic Knights conquered the region, built a castle, and founded Elbing on the lake, with a population mostly from Lübeck (today the lake, now much smaller, no longer reaches the city). After the uprising against the Teutonic Knights and the destruction of the castle by the inhabitants, the city successively came under the sovereignty of the Kingdom of Poland (1454), the Kingdom of Prussia (1772), and Germany (1871). Elbing was heavily damaged in World War II, and its remaining German citizens were expelled upon the war's end in accordance with the Potsdam Agreement. The city became again part of Poland in 1945 and was repopulated with Polish citizens.

The seaport of Truso was first mentioned ca. 890 by Wulfstan of Hedeby, an Anglo-Saxon sailor, travelling on the south coast of the Baltic Sea at the behest of King Alfred the Great of England. The exact location of Truso was not known for a long time, as the seashore has significantly changed, but most historians trace the settlement inside or near to modern Elbląg on Lake Drużno. Truso was located at territory already known to the Roman Empire and earlier.

It was an important seaport serving the Vistula River bay on the early medieval Baltic Sea trade routes which led from Birka in the north to the island of Gotland and to Visby in the Baltic Sea. From there, traders continued further south to Carnuntum along the Amber Road. The ancient Amber Road led further southwest and southeast to the Black Sea and eventually to Asia. The east–west trade route went from Truso, along the Baltic Sea to Jutland, and from there inland by river to Hedeby, a large trading center in Jutland. The main goods of Truso were amber, furs, and slaves.

Archaeological finds in 1897 and diggings in the 1920s placed Truso at Gut Hansdorf. A large burial field was also found at Elbląg. Recent Polish diggings have found burned beams and ashes and thousand-year-old artifacts in an area of about 20 hectares. Many of these artifacts are now displayed at the Muzeum w Elblągu.

Prussian Crusade 

Attempts to conquer Prussian land began in 997, when Bolesław I the Brave, at the urging of the Pope, sent a contingent of soldiers and a missionary (Adalbert of Prague) to the pagan Prussians, a non-Slavic people, on a crusade of conquest and conversion. The crusade encompassed much of the Baltic Sea coast east of the Polish city of Gdańsk, up to Sambia. Starting in 1209 additional crusades were called for by Konrad of Masovia, who mainly sought to conquer Prussian territory, rather than actually convert the indigenous Prussians. Despite heroic efforts, Old Prussian sovereignty would eventually collapse after a succession of wars instigated by Pope Honorius III and his frequent calls for crusade.

Before the Prussians were finally brought to heel, Polish rulers and the Duchy of Masovia, both by then Christianised peoples, would be continually frustrated in their attempts at northern expansion. Aside from minor border raids, major campaigns against the Prussians would be launched in 1219, 1220, and 1222. After a particularly sound defeat by Prussian forces in 1223, Polish forces in Chełmno, the seat of Christian of Oliva and the Duchy of Masovia, were forced onto the defensive.

In 1226 Duke Konrad I of Masovia summoned the Teutonic Knights for assistance; by 1230 they had secured Chełmno (Culm) and begun claiming conquered territories for themselves under the authority of the Holy Roman Empire, although these claims were rejected by the Poles, whose ambition had been to conquer Prussia all along. The Teutonic Order's strategy was to move down the Vistula and secure the delta, establishing a barrier between the Prussians and Gdańsk. The victorious Teutonic Knights built a castle at Elbing.

The Chronicon terrae Prussiae describes the conflict in the vicinity of Lake Drużno shortly before the founding of Elbing:

"All the little redoubts that they had in that place, which are said to be (list) ... and around the Drusine marsh ... he (frater Hermannus magister) assaulted and levelled by rendering them into ash, after the infidels had been killed or captured."

Truso did not disappear suddenly to be replaced with the citadel and town of Elbing during the Prussian Crusade. It had already burned down in the tenth century, with the population dispersed in the area.

Teutonic Order 
The Chronicon terrae Prussiae describes the founding of Elbing under the leadership of Hermann Balk. After building two ships, the Pilgerim (Pilgrim) and the Vridelant (Friedland), with the assistance of Margrave Henry III of Margraviate of Meissen, the Teutonic Knights used them to clear the Vistula Lagoon (Frisches Haff) and the Vistula Spit of Prussians:
...  ...
... "and the Vistula Spit was purged of the insult of the infidels..."

Apparently the river was in Pomesania, which the knights had just finished clearing, but the bay was in Pogesania. The first Elbing was placed in Pogesania:

"The master ... came to the region of Pogesania, to that island which is in the middle of the Elbing river, in that place where the Elbing enters the Vistula Lagoon, and built there a fort, which he called by the name of the Elbing River, in the year of the incarnation of the Lord, 1237. Others report that the same fort was attacked by the infidels and then was moved to the place where it is now situated, and the city gathered around it."

Both landings were amphibious operations conducted from the ships. The Chronicon relates that they were in use for many years and then were sunk in Lake Drużno. In 1238 the Dominican Order was invited to build a monastery on a grant of land. Pomesania was not secured, however, and from 1240 to 1242 the order began building a brick castle on the south side of the settlement. It may be significant that Elbing's first industry was the same as Truso's had been: manufacture of amber and bone artifacts for export. In 1243 William of Modena created the Diocese of Pomesania and three others. They were at first only ideological constructs, but the tides of time turned them into reality in that same century.

The foundation of Elbing was perhaps not the end of the Old Prussian story in the region. In 1825 a manuscript listing a vocabulary of the Baltic Old Prussian language, named the Elbing-Prussian Dictionary, or more commonly in English just Elbing Vocabulary, was found among some manuscripts from a merchant's house. It contained 802 words in a dialect now termed Pomesanian with their equivalents in an early form of German.

The origin of the vocabulary remains unknown. Its format is like that of modern travel dictionaries; i.e., it may have been used by German speakers to communicate with Old Prussians, but the specific circumstances are only speculative. The manuscript became the Codex Neumannianus. It disappeared after a British bombing raid destroyed the library at Elbing but before then facsimiles had been made. The date of the MSS was estimated at ca. 1400, but it was a copy. There is no evidence concerning the provenance of the original, except that it must have been in Pomesanian.

In 1246 the town was granted a constitution under Lübeck law, used in maritime circumstances, instead of Magdeburg rights common in other cities in Central Europe. This decision of the Order was in keeping with its general strategy of espousing the trade association that in 1358 would become the Hanseatic League. The Order seized on this association early and used it to establish bases throughout the Baltic. The Order's involvement in the League was somewhat contradictory. In whatever cities they founded the ultimate authority was the commander of the town, who kept office in the citadel, typically used as a prison. Lübeck law, on the other hand, provided for self-government of the town.

Membership in the Hanseatic League meant having important trading contacts with England, Flanders, France, and the Netherlands. The city received numerous merchant privileges from the rulers of England, Poland, Pomerania, and the Teutonic Order. For instance, the privilege of the Old Town was upgraded in 1343, while in 1393 it was granted an emporium privilege for grains, metals, and forest products.

Except for the citadel and churches, Elbing at the time was more of a small village by modern standards. It featured a wharf, a marketplace and five streets, as well as a number of churches. The castle was completed in 1251. In 1288 fire destroyed the entire settlement except for the churches, which were of brick. A new circuit wall was started immediately. From 1315 to 1340 Elbląg was rebuilt. A separate settlement called New Town was founded ca. 1337 and received Lübeck rights in 1347. In 1349 the Black Death struck the town, toward the end of the European plague. After the population recovered it continued building up the city and in 1364 a crane was built for the port.

The German-language Elbinger Rechtsbuch, written in Elbing documented among other laws for the first time Polish common law. The German-language Polish laws are based on the Sachsenspiegel and were written down to aid the judges. It is thus the oldest source for documented Polish common law and is in Polish referred to as the Księga Elbląska (Book of Elbląg). It was written down in the second half of the 13th century.

In 1410, during the Polish–Lithuanian–Teutonic War, the inhabitants of the city rebelled against the Teutonic Knights and expelled them, while welcoming Polish troops and paying homage to Polish King Władysław II Jagiełło, who afterwards vested Elbląg with new privileges. As the castle was lightly defended by a Polish garrison, the Teutonic Knights managed to retake it, promising the Polish defenders that they will be given free passage back to Poland. After the castle was taken, the Knights broke their promise and subsequently murdered a number of the captured defenders while imprisoning the rest.

Kingdom of Poland

In February 1440, the city hosted a convention at which delegates from various cities (including Elbląg itself) and nobility from the region decided to establish the anti-Teutonic Prussian Confederation. In April and May 1440, further meetings were held in Elbląg, at which more towns and noblemen joined the organisation. In 1454, the organisation led the revolt against the rule of the Teutonic Knights, and then its delegation submitted a petition to King Casimir IV of Poland asking him to include the region within the Kingdom of Poland. The King agreed and signed the act of incorporation of the region (including Elbląg) to the Kingdom of Poland in March 1454 in Kraków, which sparked the Thirteen Years' War, the longest of all Polish–Teutonic wars. The local mayor pledged allegiance to the Polish King during the incorporation in March 1454, and the burghers of Elbląg recognized Casimir IV as rightful ruler. After paying homage to the King, the city was granted great privileges, similar to those of Toruń and Gdańsk. Since 1454, the city was authorized by King Casimir IV to mint Polish coins. The war ended in a Polish victory in 1466, with the Second Peace of Thorn, in which the Teutonic Order renounced any claims to the city and recognised it as part of Poland.

Within the Kingdom of Poland, the city was administratively part of the Malbork Voivodeship in the newly established autonomous province of Royal Prussia, later also within the larger Greater Poland Province. The city was known to the Polish crown by its Polish name Elbląg. With the creation of the Polish–Lithuanian Commonwealth in 1569, the city was brought under direct control of the Polish crown. As one of the largest and most influential cities of Poland, it enjoyed voting rights during the royal election period in Poland.

With the 16th century Protestant Reformation the burghers became Lutherans and the first Lutheran Gymnasium was established in Elbląg in 1535.

From 1579 Elbląg had close trade relations with England, to which the city accorded free trade. English, Scottish, and Irish merchants settled in the city. They formed the Scottish Reformed Church of Elbląg and became Elbląg citizens, aiding Lutheran Sweden in the Thirty Years' War. The rivalry of nearby Gdańsk interrupted trading links several times. By 1618 Elbląg had left the Hanseatic League owing to its close business dealings with England.

Famous inhabitants of the city at that time included native sons Hans von Bodeck and Samuel Hartlib. During the Thirty Years' War, Swedish Chancellor Axel Oxenstierna brought the Moravian Brethren refugee John Amos Comenius to Elbląg for six years (1642–1648). In 1642 Johann Stobäus, who composed with Johann Eccard, published the  Preussische Fest-Lieder, a number of evangelical Prussian songs. In 1646 the city recorder Daniel Barholz noted that the city council employed Bernsteindreher, or Paternostermacher, licensed and guilded amber craftsmen who worked on prayer beads, rosaries, and many other items made of amber. Members of the Barholz family became mayors and councillors.

During the Thirty Years' War, the Vistula Lagoon was the main southern Baltic base of King Gustavus Adolphus of Sweden, who was hailed as the protector of the Protestants. By 1660 the Vistula Lagoon had gone to Elector Frederick William of Brandenburg-Prussia, but was returned in 1700.

The poet Christian Wernicke was born in 1661 in Elbląg, while Gottfried Achenwall became famous for his teachings in natural law and human rights law. In 1700–1710 it was occupied by Swedish troops. In 1709 it was besieged, taken by storm on February 2, 1710, by Russian troops with support of Prussian artillery. The city was handed over to Polish King Augustus II in 1712.

The Royal-Polish mathematician and cartographer Johann Friedrich Endersch completed a map of Warmia in 1755 and also made a copper etching of the galley named "The City of Elbing" .

During the War of the Polish Succession in 1734, Elbląg was placed under military occupation by Russia and Saxony. The town came again under occupation by Russia from 1758 to 1762 during the Seven Years' War.

Kingdom of Prussia
During the First Partition of Poland in 1772 Elbląg was annexed by King Frederick the Great of the Kingdom of Prussia. Elbing became part of the newly established province of West Prussia in 1773. In the 1815 provincial reorganization following the Napoleonic Wars, Elbing and its hinterland were included within Regierungsbezirk Danzig in West Prussia.

In October and November 1831, various Polish infantry, cavalry and artillery units, engineer corps and sappers of the November Uprising stopped in the city and its environs on the way to their internment locations, whereas the general staff with Commander-in-Chief General Maciej Rybiński and generals Józef Bem, Marcin Klemensowski, Kazimierz Małachowski, Ludwik Michał Pac and Antoni Wroniecki was interned in the city. On December 22, 1831, the Prussian army attempted to pacify the Polish insurgents and launched a charge on the disarmed Poles, who resisted relocation, fearing deportation to the Russian Partition of Poland. Some insurgents eventually left partitioned Poland for the Great Emigration, including Józef Bem, who was expelled by the Prussians in December 1831, and Maciej Rybiński, who left the city in February 1832.

Elbing industrialized. In 1828 the first steamship was built by Ignatz Grunau. In 1837 Ferdinand Schichau started the Schichau-Werke company in Elbing as well as another shipyard in Danzig (Gdańsk) later on. Schichau constructed the Borussia, the first screw-vessel in Germany. Schichau-Werke built hydraulic machinery, ships, steam engines, and torpedoes. After the inauguration of the railway to Königsberg in 1853, Elbing's industry began to grow. Schichau worked together with his son-in-law Carl H. Zise, who continued the industrial complex after Schichau's death. Schichau erected large complexes for his many thousands of workers.

Georg Steenke, an engineer from Königsberg, connected Elbing near the Baltic Sea with the southern part of Prussia by building the Oberländischer Kanal (Elbląg Canal).

Elbing became part of the Prussian-led German Empire in 1871 during the unification of Germany. As Elbing became an industrial city, the Social Democratic Party of Germany (SPD) frequently received the majority of votes; in the 1912 Reichstag elections the SPD received 51% of the vote. After World War I, as most of the province of West Prussia was reintegrated with the reborn Polish Republic, Elbing was joined to the German province of East Prussia, and was separated from Weimar Germany by the so-called Polish Corridor.

Nazi Germany

During World War II, under Nazi Germany, a Nazi prison, a forced labour subcamp of the Stalag I-A POW camp, a forced labour subcamp of the Stalag XX-B POW camp, and three subcamps of the Stutthof concentration camp were operated in the city. The Germans also enslaved Poles as forced labour in the city. The Polish resistance was active and infiltrated the German arms industry. The prison and forced labour camps were closed and many of the German inhabitants forced to flee as the Soviet Red Army approached the city toward the end of the war. Laid under siege since January 23, 1945, about 65% of the city infrastructure was destroyed, including most of the historical city center. The town was captured by the Soviet Red Army during the night of February 9/10, 1945. During the first days of the siege most of the population of approximately 100,000 persons fled. After the end of war, in spring 1945, the region together with the city became again part of Poland, although with a Soviet-installed communist regime, which stayed in power until the Fall of Communism in the 1980s, as a result of the Potsdam Conference. The area was settled by Poles after remaining Germans were either transferred or fled to Germany. As of 1 November 1945 16.838 Germans remained in the town.

History after 1945
Elbląg was part of the so-called Recovered Territories and out of the new inhabitants, 98% were Poles expelled from former eastern Polish areas annexed by the Soviet Union. Parts of the damaged historical city center were completely demolished, with the bricks being used to rebuild Warsaw and Gdańsk. The Communist authorities had originally planned that the Old Town, utterly destroyed during the fighting since January 23, 1945, would be built over with blocks of flats; however, economic difficulties thwarted this effort. Two churches were reconstructed and the remaining ruins of the old town were torn down in the 1960s.

Along with Tricity and Szczecin, Elbląg was the scene of the Polish 1970 protests. Since 1990 the German minority population has had a modest resurgence, with the Elbinger Deutsche Minderheit Organization counting around 450 members in 2000.

Restoration of the Old Town began after 1989. Since the beginning of the restoration, an extensive archaeological programme has been carried out. Most of the city's heritage was destroyed during the construction of basements in the 19th century or during World War II, but the backyards and latrines of the houses remained largely unchanged, and have provided information on the city's history. In some instances, private investors have incorporated parts of preserved stonework into new architecture. By 2006, approximately 75% of the Old Town had been reconstructed.

Elbląg is also home to the Elbrewery, Poland's largest brewery, which belongs to the Żywiec Group (Heineken). The history of the Elblag Brewing Tradition dates back to 1309, when Teutonic Master Siegfried von Leuchtwangen granted brewing privileges to the city. The present brewery was founded in 1872 as the Elbinger Aktien-Brauerei. In the early 1900s, the brewery was the exclusive supplier of Pilsner beer to the court of German Emperor Wilhelm II.

Historic buildings

Until World War II there were many Gothic, Renaissance and Baroque houses in Elbląg's Old Town; some of them are reconstructed. Other preserved buildings are:
St. Nicholas Cathedral - a monumental 13th-century Gothic church (cathedral only from 1992, before it was a parochial church), destroyed by fire in the late 18th century, then damaged in World War II and repaired
Brama Targowa (Market Gate) - erected in 1319
St. Mary's Church - former Dominican church, erected in the 13th century, rebuilt in the 14th and 16th centuries; damaged in World War II and reconstructed in 1961 as an art gallery; remnants of cloister are partially preserved
Holy Ghost church with hospital, from the 14th century
Corpus Christi church from the 14th century

Culture

The primary cultural institutions in Elbląg are the Archaeological and Historical Museum, the Cyprian Norwid Elbląg Library, the EL Gallery Art Center and the Aleksander Sewruk Theater. The museum presents many pieces of art and items of everyday use, including the only 15th century binoculars preserved in Europe.

Population

Institutions of higher education

 Elbląg Higher School of Arts and Economics
 Faculty of Pedagogy
 Faculty of Administration
 Faculty of Health Sciences
 Faculty of Economics and Politics
 Elbląg Higher State College of Vocational Education (Państwowa Wyższa Szkoła Zawodowa)
 Faculty of Pedagogy and Foreign Languages
 Faculty of Economics
 Faculty of Applied Computer Science
 Faculty of Technical Sciences
 Bogdan Jański Higher School, Faculty in Elbląg (Szkoła Wyższa im. Bogdana Jańskiego)
 Faculty of Management and Land Management
 Elbląg Diocese Theological Seminary (Wyższe Seminarium Duchowne Diecezji Elbląskiej)
 Regent College - Foreign Language Teacher Training College (Regent College - Nauczycielskie Kolegium Języków Obcych)
 Faculty of English Studies

Sports
 EB Start Elbląg - women's handball team playing in the Polish Women's Superliga (top division; as of 2022–23)
 Olimpia Elbląg - men's football club

Politics

Constituency
Members of Parliament (Sejm) elected from Elbląg constituency.

 Jan Antochowski, SLD-UP
 Danuta Ciborowska, SLD-UP
 Witold Gintowt-Dziewałtowski, SLD-UP
 Stanisław Gorczyca, PO
 Jerzy Müller, SLD-UP
 Adam Ołdakowski, Samoobrona
 Andrzej Umiński, SLD-UP
 Stanisław Żelichowski, PSL

International relations

Twin towns — sister cities
Elbląg is twinned with:

Former twin towns
 Kaliningrad, Kaliningrad Oblast, Russia (since 1994 until 2022)
 Baltiysk, Kaliningrad Oblast, Russia (since 1994 until 2022)
 Novogrudok, Belarus (since 1995 until 2022)

On 28 February 2022, Elbląg ended its partnership with the Russian cities of Kaliningrad and Baltiysk and the Belarusian city of Novogrudok as a response to the 2022 Russian invasion of Ukraine and its active support by the Republic of Belarus.

Notable people
 Georg Kleefeld (1522–1576), mayor of Danzig
 Hans von Bodeck (1582–1658), diplomat and Chancellor of Brandenburg
 John Amos Comenius (1592–1670), educator
 Samuel Hartlib, teacher and scientist
 Christian Wernicke (1661–1725), epigrammist and diplomat
 Charles Aloysius Ramsay (1677–1680) Scottish-Prussian writer on stenography and translator 
 Johann Friedrich Endersch (1705–1769), mathematician geographer
 Gottfried Achenwall (1719–1772), statistician
 Eberhard Gottlieb Graff (1780–1841) German philologist.
 Wilhelm Baum (1799–1883) a German surgeon 
 Wilhelm Eduard Albrecht (1800–1876), lawyer, member of Göttinger Sieben
 Bruno Erhard Abegg (1803–1848), statesman of Königsberg
 Ferdinand Schichau (1814–1896), founder of the Schichau-Werke in Elbing and Danzig
 John Prince-Smith (1809–1874), liberal economist and politician in Germany
 Johannes Kohtz (1843–1918), German chess player
 Reinhold Felderhoff (1865–1919) German sculptor.
 Maximilian Consbruch (1866–1927), German classical philologist and gymnasium principal 
 Hermann Schulz (1872–1929), German politician 
 Paul Pulewka (1896–1989) German pharmacologist
 Max Reimann (1898–1977), president of the Communist Party of Germany
 Erich Brost (1903–1995) publisher
 Günter Kuhnke (1912–1990), Admiral
 Hans-Dieter Lange (1926–2012), journalist
 Hans-Jürgen Krupp (born 1933) German politician, economist and University professor 
 Brigitte Birnbaum (born 1938) German author of books, mainly for children and young people
 Ursula Karusseit (1939–2019), German actress
 Bernd Neumann (born 1942), German politician
 Ortwin Runde (born 1944), mayor of Hamburg from 1997 to 2001.
 Andrzej Sakson (born 1950), sociologist and director of the Western Institute
 Henryk Iwaniec (born 1947), mathematician
 Wojciech Cejrowski (born 1964), journalist, writer
 Adam Fedoruk (born 1966), footballer
 Ewa Białołęcka (born 1967), fantasy writer
 Piotr Wadecki (born 1973), cyclist
 Maciej Bykowski (born 1977), footballer
 Adam Wadecki (born 1977), cyclist
 Dominika Figurska (born 1978), actress
 Radosław Wojtaszek (born 1987), chess grandmaster
 Krzysztof Jotko (born 1989), MMA fighter
 Joanna Wołosz (born 1990), volleyball player

See also
 EB - Polish beer produced by the Elbrewery Company

Notes

External links

Government websites 
 Municipal website
 Gmina of Elbląg 
 Elbląg County

Tourism and historical sites 
 CastlesOfPoland.com
 Interactive map of Elbląg 
 Tourism information 
 Elbing Vocabulary, presentation by Dr. Letis Palmaitis
 Jewish community of Elbląg on Virtual Shtetl

Web portals 
 Wirtualny Elbląg - portal 
 Elbląska Gazeta Internetowa - portal 
 Elblag24 - portal 
 info.elblag.pl - portal 
 Nocny Elbląg - portal 
 Dziennik Elbląski newspaper 
 Extensive East & West Prussian Historical Materials  

 
City counties of Poland
Cities and towns in Warmian-Masurian Voivodeship
Members of the Hanseatic League
Cities with powiat rights